Nueva Colombia may refer to:
 Nueva Colombia District, in Paraguay
 Liga Deportiva Nueva Colombia, in Paraguay
 Agencia de Noticias Nueva Colombia (ANNCOL)